John Hay (1546–1608), Latinized Joannes Haius or Hayus, was a Scottish Jesuit scholar and educator. Born to the Hays of Delgatie, he was a relative of Edmund Hay. In 1576 he took part in a disputation against a Protestant theologian in Strasbourg. For some time he was attached to the Collège de Tournon, engaging in controversy with the Huguenots of La Rochelle, in particular Jean de Serres. He later moved to the Low Countries, where he published Latin translations of works from and about Jesuit missions overseas.

Publications
 Demandes faictes aux ministres d'Escosse: touchant la religion Chrestienne (1583)
 German translation as Fragstuck des Christlichen Glaubens, an die nieuwe sectische Predigkanten (1586)
 L'Antimoine aux Responses, que Th. de Beze faict à trente sept demandes de deux cents et six, proposées aux Ministres d'Escosse (1588).

As translator
 Diego de Torres Bollo, De rebus Peruanis (Antwerp, Martinus Nutius, 1604).
 De rebus Japonicis, Indicis et Peruanis epistolae recentiores (Antwerp, Martinus Nutius, 1605).

References

Attribution

1546 births
1608 deaths
16th-century Scottish Jesuits
17th-century Scottish Jesuits